Alvania angularis is a species of minute sea snail, a marine gastropod mollusk or micromollusk in the family Rissoidae.

Description

Distribution
Distribution of Alvania angularis include:
 Iceland

The type locality is off northwestern Iceland (66°31' N, 25°37' W) in the depth 659 m.

References

Rissoidae
Gastropods described in 1996